List of chairmen of the People's Khural of Buryatia.

This is a list of chairmen (speakers) of the Supreme Council 1990–1994:

This is a list of chairmen (speakers) of the People's Khural of Buryatia

Sources

Lists of legislative speakers in Russia
Chairmen